"Dirt off Your Shoulder" is the second single released from Jay-Z's 2003 album The Black Album.

In 2004, the song was combined with the Linkin Park single "Lying from You" and released as a single for the mash-up album Collision Course.

Political influence
On April 17, 2008, Democratic presidential candidate Barack Obama referenced the song in gesture, in response to sharp attacks from his then-rival Hillary Clinton and a debate which was widely criticized for focusing on campaign gaffes rather than on candidates' policy positions. Referencing his opponents' "textbook Washington" tactics, focusing on personal attacks and trivial issues, Obama used Jay-Z's hand signal to "brush the dirt" off his shoulders. When asked whether Obama was deliberately referencing the song, a campaign spokesman said, "He has some Jay-Z on his iPod."

Clinton later made the same gesture during her appearance before the House Select Committee on Benghazi.

Formats and track listings

A-Side
 Dirt off Your Shoulder (Radio Edit)
 Dirt off Your Shoulder (LP)
 Dirt off Your Shoulder (Instrumental)

B-Side
 Encore (Radio Edit) 
 Encore (LP) 
 Encore (Instrumental)

99 Problems/Dirt off Your Shoulder, Pt. 1

 99 Problems (Explicit)
 Dirt off Your Shoulder (Explicit)

99 Problems/Dirt off Your Shoulder, Pt. 2

 99 Problems (Explicit)
 Dirt off Your Shoulder (Explicit) 
 99 Problems (Video)
 Dirt off Your Shoulder (Video)

99 Problems/Dirt off Your Shoulder, Vinyl
A-Side
 99 Problems (Explicit) 
 99 Problems (Clean) 
B-Side
 Dirt off Your Shoulder (Explicit) 
 Dirt off Your Shoulder (Clean)

Charts

In the U.S. the song peaked at number 5 on the Billboard Hot 100 making it Jay-Z's third highest peak on the chart at the time (tied with "Swagga Like Us").

Weekly charts

Year-end charts

Certifications

Release history

See also
List of songs recorded by Jay-Z

References

External links

2003 singles
Jay-Z songs
Music videos directed by Dave Meyers (director)
Song recordings produced by Timbaland
Songs written by Jay-Z
Roc-A-Fella Records singles
Def Jam Recordings singles